Paula Klien (born in Rio de Janeiro) is a contemporary Brazilian artist.

Biography 

In 2016, Klien returned to painting, and presented her most recent work in February 2017, in the individual painting ""invisibilities"", in Berlin.

“Invisibilities" consists of eleven large paintings on canvas and paper, two backlights and a three-dimensional work created with chinese ink on foam.

In March 2017, she participated in the Clio Art Fair in New York City, and in May participated in arteBA in Buenos Aires.

Self taught in drawing, painting and photography, she also studied at the visual arts school of Parque Lage (EAV) in 1982, participated in a lab with Steve McCurry – New York City in 2006 and studied at the Kunst Gut Academy of Fine Arts – Berlin in 2015.

References

Further reading 
 It's Raining Men (exhibition catalogue). Rio de Janeiro: Mauad X, 2010. .
 Paula Klien expõe seus trabalhos em feira de arte argentina: espie, Glamurama, 25 May 2017
 Paula Klien participa da arteBA com sete inéditas, Deloox, 22 May 2017
 ArteBA tem Brasil e Alemanha no Comitê de Seleção, Atelier, 24 May 2017

Living people
Brazilian artists
Year of birth missing (living people)